Nebria suensoni is a species of ground beetle in the Nebriinae subfamily that is endemic to China.

References

suensoni
Beetles described in 1983
Beetles of Asia
Endemic fauna of China